Sandra Stals (born 5 June 1975 in Maaseik) is a retired Belgian middle distance runner who specialized in the 800 metres.

She won the bronze medal at the 2000 European Indoor Championships and finished sixth at the 2002 European Indoor Championships.

Her personal best 800 m time is 1:58.31 minutes, achieved in August 1998 in Hechtel.

Competition record

References

1975 births
Living people
Belgian female middle-distance runners
Athletes (track and field) at the 2000 Summer Olympics
Olympic athletes of Belgium
People from Maaseik
Sportspeople from Limburg (Belgium)
21st-century Belgian women